Camp Kosciuszko is the US V Corps' Forward Operating Station Poznan (FOS Poznan), Poland also denoted V Corps Headquarters (Forward). Forward Operating Station Poznan is the permanent headquarters for V Corps (Forward), which was announced in June 2022 by US President Joe Biden, as the eastern flank of the NATO alliance. The first permanent change of station (PCS) to Camp Kosciuszko took place in February 2023.

FOS Poznan was renamed Camp Kosciuszko on 30 July 2022, for Thaddeus Kosciuszko (Tadeusz Kościuszko), a hero of the American Revolutionary War who is commemorated in the US and Poland.

Notes

References

External links
https://www.flickr.com/photos/ministerstwoobronynarodowej/52250478717/in/album-72177720300938599/ - General Darryl A. Williams, Commanding General, U.S. Army Europe and Africa, at opening ceremony

United States military presence in other countries
Military installations of the United States in Poland
Buildings and structures in Poznań